Howtown is a hamlet in Cumbria, England, situated at a small harbour on the east shore of Ullswater in the Lake District. It lies within the civil parish of Martindale.

Howtown is about three and a half miles from Pooley Bridge and is best reached by water. The Ullswater 'Steamers' regularly stop there on their way from Glenridding at the southern end of Ullswater to Pooley Bridge at the northern end of the lake.

The name Howtown means "farmstead on the hill". The place name is from the Old Norse word haugr, meaning "hill" or "mound", and the Old English word tūn, meaning "town". It contains the Howtown Hotel, Outward Bound Centre and Waternook Lakeside Accommodation. Howtown was founded by the How (or Howe) family.

See also

Listed buildings in Martindale, Cumbria

References

External links

Howtown Centre, Howtown
Map of the Lake District
Lake District Walks - Ullswater Lake Walks, Howtown To Glenridding

Hamlets in Cumbria
Martindale, Cumbria